Romanat may refer to:

 Romanat, a village in Rrashbull, Albania
 Romanat, Ethiopia, a village on the Ilala River in Ethiopia
 United Principalities romanat, a proposed Romanian currency